The Mongolian Republican Party (Mongolyn Bügd Nairamdakh Nam), usually shortened to simply the Republican Party, is a political party in Mongolia founded in the early 1990s with a conservative ideology.

The party was named the Mongolian Bourgeois Party until April 1997.

References

External links
Official website (in Mongolian)

Political parties in Mongolia